Historia Mathematica: International Journal of History of Mathematics is an academic journal on the history of mathematics published by Elsevier. It was established by Kenneth O. May in 1971 as the free newsletter Notae de Historia Mathematica, but by its sixth issue in 1974 had turned into a full journal.

The International Commission on the History of Mathematics began awarding the Montucla Prize, for the best article by an early career scholar in Historia Mathematica, in 2009. The award is given every four years.

Editors 
The editors of the journal have been:
 Kenneth O. May, 1974–1977
 Joseph W. Dauben, 1977–1985
 Eberhard Knobloch, 1985–1994
 David E. Rowe, 1994–1996
 Karen Hunger Parshall, 1996–2000
 Craig Fraser and Umberto Bottazzini, 2000–2004
 Craig Fraser, 2004–2007
 Benno van Dalen, 2007–2009
 June Barrow-Green and Niccolò Guicciardini, 2010–2013
 Niccolò Guicciardini and Tom Archibald, 2013-2015
 Tom Archibald and Reinhard Siegmund-Schultze, 2016–present

Abstracting and indexing 
The journal is abstracted and indexed in Mathematical Reviews, SCISEARCH, and Scopus.

References 

 
 A Brief History of the International Commission on the History of Mathematics (ICHM)

External links 
 
 Historia Mathematica at the International Commission on the History of Mathematics

Elsevier academic journals
Quarterly journals
Publications established in 1974
English-language journals
History of mathematics journals